Colomba is a short novel by Prosper Mérimée which first appeared on 1 July 1840 in the Revue des Deux Mondes. It was published as a single volume in 1841 by Magen et Comon.

Plot summary
Through the lens of historical fiction, the novella examines the Corsican vendetta. In the story, Orso is forced to consider whether he should avenge the death of his father, apparently perpetrated by the Barricini family. An Englishwoman, Lydia Nevil, attempts to dissuade him from murder, while his sister, Colomba, uses all her cunning to ensure the opposite result.

Characters 
Brandolaccio "Brando" Savelli - a friendly Corsican outlaw
Brusco - Brando's dog
Colomba della Rebbia - the titular character and sister to Orso
Colonel Nevil - Lydia's father
Giudice Barricini - a barrister and head of the Barricini family
le Curé - a former theology student, now an outlaw
Lydia Nevil - an Englishwoman and romantic interest of Orso
Orlanduccio Barricini - son of Giudice Barricini
Orso della Rebbia - Colomba's brother
Vincentello Barricini - son of Giudice Barricini

References

Works by Prosper Mérimée
1840 short stories
French short stories
French novellas
Novels set in Corsica